"Little Houses" is a song written by Skip Ewing and Mickey Cates, and recorded by American country music artist Doug Stone.  It was released in October 1994 as the first and only single from his Greatest Hits, Vol. 1 compilation album.  The song reached number 7 on the Billboard Hot Country Singles & Tracks chart.

Music video
The music video was directed by Marius Penczner and premiered in late 1994.

Chart performance

References

1995 singles
1994 songs
Doug Stone songs
Songs written by Skip Ewing
Song recordings produced by James Stroud
Epic Records singles
Songs written by Mickey Cates